The Martinis are a rock band formed in Los Angeles, California in 1993. The band consists of Pixies guitarist Joey Santiago and his wife Linda Mallari, both of Filipino descent. They have released one album under the label Cooking Vinyl, Artist Direct, and Distracted/BMG.  Their song "Free" was featured in the movie Empire Records and was on the movie's soundtrack album.

Discography
The Martinis (1998)
The Smitten Sessions E.P. (April 6, 2004) - released by Distracted Records, and featuring Pixies drummer Dave Lovering on the fifth track.
Smitten (May 4, 2004) - Released by Cooking Vinyl

References

External links
[ The Martinis at All Music]

Alternative rock groups from California
Musical groups established in 1993
1993 establishments in California
Filipino-American musical groups
Musical groups from Los Angeles